Knut Mørch Hansson (16 April 1920 – 3 December 1994) was a Norwegian actor. He was born in Alexandria, a son of judge Michael Hansson and Emilie Christensen. He was a brother of diplomat Arthur Mørch Hansson. He made his stage debut at Det Nye Teater in 1940. During the German occupation of Norway Hansson joined the Norwegian resistance movement. He was arrested and incarcerated in the Sachsenhausen concentration camp in Germany until 1945. In 1945 he continued his acting career with Studioteatret. He was later appointed at various theatres, including Det Nye Teater, Den Nationale Scene, Trøndelag Teater and Oslo Nye Teater, and with guest appearances at Riksteatret and Fjernsynsteatret. Among his film appearances are Englandsfarere from 1946 and I slik en natt from 1958. He chaired the Norwegian Actors' Equity Association from 1970 to 1974. He penned the memoirs of Herman Kahan, Ilden og lyset, in 1988, and his own memoirs in Kurer og fange from 1992.

He was father of politician Rasmus Hansson.

References 

1920 births
1994 deaths
People from Alexandria
Norwegian expatriates in Egypt
Norwegian expatriates in Switzerland
Norwegian Army personnel of World War II
Norwegian resistance members
Norwegian prisoners sentenced to death
Prisoners sentenced to death by Germany
Grini concentration camp survivors
Sachsenhausen concentration camp survivors
20th-century Norwegian male actors
Norwegian male film actors
Norwegian male stage actors
Norwegian World War II memoirists
20th-century Norwegian writers